Magtu (also Romanized as Magṭūʿ; also known as 'Makţū‘ and Maqţū‘) is a village in Esmailiyeh Rural District, in the Central District of Ahvaz County, Khuzestan Province, Iran. At the 2006 census, its population was 653, in 126 families.

References 

Populated places in Ahvaz County